Eddie Murphy (born 1961) is an American actor and comedian

Eddie Murphy may also refer to:

Eddie Murphy (album), his self-titled 1982 comedy album
Eddie Murphy (baseball) (1891–1969), American baseball player
Eddie Murphy (speed skater) (1905–1973), American speed skater
Eddie Murphy (footballer, born 1934), Scottish football player (Clyde FC, Oldham Athletic)
Eddie Murphy (footballer, born 1881) (1881–1916), English footballer
Eddie Murphy (footballer, born 1924), Scottish football player (played in the 1947–48 Scottish Cup)
Eddie Murphy (hurler), hurling coach and former player from Co. Cork

See also
 Audie Murphy (1925–1971), American soldier, actor, songwriter, and rancher
 Edward Murphy (disambiguation)

Murphy, Eddie